Sands of Fire is a 1989 video game published by Three-Sixty Pacific.

Gameplay
Sands of Fire is a game in which a World War II tank simulation is set in North Africa.

Reception
Bob Proctor reviewed the game for Computer Gaming World, and stated that "Frankly, Sands of Fire is a competent program that does not break any new ground in computer gaming. Still, graphics and sound are above average and, though it is not an overly accurate simulation, it has enough realistic "feel" to satisfy many of us. Further, it is very easy to play and successfully recreates some of the feel of the frenzied tank battles around Tobruk."

The MAC version of the game was voted best war game of 1989 by Computer Entertainer magazine.

Reviews
Computer Gaming World - Dec, 1991
ASM (Aktueller Software Markt) - Oct, 1991
Power Play - 1991-10

References

External links

Award

1989 video games
Classic Mac OS games
Cultural depictions of Erwin Rommel
DOS games
First-person video games
Tank simulation video games
Video games about Nazi Germany
Video games developed in the United States
Video games set in Africa
Windows games
World War II video games